The Myanmar Ambassador in Paris is the official representative of the Government in Naypyidaw to the Government of France and concurrently to the UNESCO, the governments in Madrid and Lisbon.

History
Since 1989 Union of Myanmar

List of representatives

See also
 France–Myanmar relations

References 

 
France
Myanmar